Phlegmariurus cumingii is a species of plant in the family Lycopodiaceae. It is endemic to Ecuador.  Its natural habitats are subtropical or tropical moist montane forest and subtropical or tropical high-altitude grassland.

References

cumingii
Endemic flora of Ecuador
Least concern plants
Taxonomy articles created by Polbot
Taxobox binomials not recognized by IUCN